Bryoria implexa is a species of horsehair lichen in the family Parmeliaceae.

Habit
Bryoria implexa has a dark brown or olive colour. The thallus is cylindrical and hairlike, 5–10 cm long and hanging. The main branches are 0,2-0,3 mm in diameter but the narrower branches are 0,1 mm.

Distribution and habitat
The native distribution of Bryorya implexa is North-America and Europe, including Iceland where it has only been found in one location, Gálgahraun in Álftanes, where its preferred habitat is lava rock.

Conservation status
Bryoria implexa is red listed in Iceland as critically endangered (CR) due to it being found in only one location in the country. The species is extinct (EX) in Britain.

As of April 2021, its conservation status has not been estimated by the IUCN.

Chemistry
Bryoria implexa contains norstictic acid.

References

implexa
Lichen species
Lichens described in 1796
Lichens of Europe
Lichens of North America
Taxa named by Georg Franz Hoffmann
Lichens of Iceland